Ben Johnson is a 2005 Malayalam-language action thriller film directed by Anil C. Menon and produced by Milan Jaleel. The film stars Kalabhavan Mani in a dual role with Indraja, Siddique and Vijayaraghavan. The film has songs composed by Deepak Dev. It was released on 24 June 2005. The songs were well received, especially the song "Sona..Sona.." sung by Kalabhavan Mani and "Iniyum mizhikal nirayaruthe" by K.J. Yesudas. It was later dubbed in Odia under the same title. The movie was a hit and one of the highest-grossing movies of the year.

Synopsis
Amarakaran Pathrose is a name to reckon with in village Muthangakuzhi. He is the monarch of all that he surveys, thanks to his rough and ready methods. Fear stalks the village whenever he gets into ‘action’.

His son, Ben Johnson is everything that the fear-inspiring father is not. He goes out of his way to be nice to one and all, in an effort to erase the bad reputation set by his father. Johnson has always cherished the dream of becoming a policeman.

Ever since his childhood, Johnson has been good in sports. Thanks to his excellence in athletics, the villagers start calling him Ben Johnson because of his physical resemblance to the famous Canadian sprinter.

Johnson manages to become a sub-inspector (SI) in Kerala police, under the sports quota! As destiny would have it, Johnson is posted as the SI in his own village of Muthangakuzhi. Now he is driven by a missionary zeal to rid the village of rowdies and baddies, both social as well as political.

Cast

Music

The music was composed by Deepak Dev, with lyrics written by Arjun Sasi and Kaithapram.

References

External links
 

2005 films
2000s Malayalam-language films